Scythris amplexella is a moth of the family Scythrididae. It was described by Bengt Å. Bengtsson in 2002. It is found in Sudan, the United Arab Emirates, Yemen and Oman.

Etymology
The species name refers to the shape of segment 8, embracing the genitalia with its more or less pointed extensions and is derived from Latin amplexus (meaning embracing, embrace).

References

amplexella
Moths described in 2002